TrSS Sarnia was a passenger vessel built for the London and South Western Railway in 1910. During the First World War, she served in the Royal Navy as the armed boarding steamer HMS Sarnia.

History

Sarnia was built by Cammell Laird in Birkenhead, England, and launched on 9 July 1910. Propulsion was by two double ended marine boilers providing steam for a set of Parsons turbines driving three shafts. Passenger accommodations were for 186 first and 114 second class passengers supported by 48 crew. Sarnia was one of a pair of ships ordered by the London and South Western Railway, the other being . They were the first turbine steamers ordered by the railway company. They were deployed on the route to the Channel Islands for a few years until the outbreak of the First World War.

The Admiralty requisitioned her during the First World War for use by the Royal Navy and reconfigured her as the armed boarding steamer HMS Sarnia. On 28 October 1915 she collided with the auxiliary minesweeper  in the Dardanelles; Hythe sank with the loss of 154 lives.

The Imperial German Navy submarine  sank Sarnia in the Mediterranean Sea off Alexandria, Egypt, on 12 September 1918 with the loss of 53 crew.

References

1910 ships
Steamships of the United Kingdom
Ships of the London and South Western Railway
Ships built on the River Mersey
Maritime incidents in 1915
Maritime incidents in 1918
Ships sunk by German submarines in World War I
World War I shipwrecks in the Mediterranean Sea